Ross Newton (born 20 February 1967) is an Australian actor born in Melbourne, Victoria, he graduated from NIDA in 1989, and is best known for playing Greg Marshall in the television soap opera Home and Away.

Career
Newton grew up in the Australian city Melbourne. Newton first wanted to act aged five, after watching the film The Wizard of Oz. After watching numerous Marlon Brando, Robert De Niro and Dennis Hopper films, Newton realised we wanted a career in acting. To begin his acting career, Newton studied at the National Institute of Dramatic Art (NIDA) in Sydney, New South Wales. Newton's parents believed that acting would only be a mere hobby for their son. However, aged fifteen at NIDA, he began appearing in Melbourne based theatre shows. He graduated from NIDA in 1989 but had already began making contacts within the television industry.

In 1990, Newton joined the cast of the Nine Network soap opera Family and Friends, playing the role of construction worker Thommo. Thommo was Newton's first regular and prominent television role. In 1991, Newton played the role of John Harding in the Australian erotic thriller film Fatal Bond. That year, Newton joined the cast of Seven Network soap opera Home and Away, playing the regular role of Greg Marshall. Newton originally signed a two-year contract with the series. During Newton's time on the show, he created an iconic character and storyline with Nicolle Dickson who played Bobby Simpson. After one year in the series, Newton believed his character was boring and convinced producers to make Greg a more exciting role by committing adultery. Newton decided to leave the role in 1993. In 1994, Newton joined other Australian actors in the British pantomime season.

In 2002, Newton appeared in the Australian-American science fiction television series, Farscape, playing the role of Sloggard. Newton was seen by casting directors for the role of Samwise Gamgee in The Lord of the Rings film franchise. He "worked hard" on the audition but lost out to Sean Astin.

Personal life
Newton is openly gay but never spoke about his sexuality during his early career. Newton has been in a relationship with dressage rider and trainer, Lucas Hurps for more than twenty-five years. In 2019, Newton revealed that he concealed his sexuality on the advice of a Home and Away producer who suggested being honest could affect his acting career. Newton recalled that it was "really challenging" and had a "huge effect" on his personal life. He similarly told a reporter from The Daily Telegraph that he believed his sexuality had affected which acting roles he won, adding "there was a big shadow about my sexuality and ageing gay." Away from acting, Newton works as a fundraiser and development co-ordinator for the Western Sydney University, which he still works as of 2022.

Filmography

Sources:

References

External links
 

1967 births
Australian male film actors
Australian male television actors
Australian gay actors
Living people
People educated at Ivanhoe Grammar School